The Netherlands national rugby league team is the national rugby league team of The Netherlands. It was formed in January 2003. The national team played its first international match in 2003 against Scotland A, where they lost 22–18.

History
Rugby league foundation year was in 2003 where it has regularly being played since 2003 under the NNRLB and has seen small domestic growth along the way. The first rugby league club match was played between Te Werve Bustards (Den Haag) and touring Essex Eels. After rugby league ceased in 2008 a new board the Nederlandse Rugby League Bond (NRLB) was entrusted to administer and grow the game in the Netherlands in 2009.
 
The Dutch participated in 1989 Student Rugby League World Cup in England, against Australia, England, France, New Zealand, Wales, Ireland and Scotland. The first rugby league match in Netherlands was a preparation match for the tournament against the French Army side at the Royal Military Academy in Breda. While in the late 1980s they faced Toulouse to earn a 20 all draw. Having played their first international against Scotland A in Sassenheim only narrowly losing 18 to 22, introducing the Rotterdam Cup in 2004 with a 24–14 loss to Scotland Students and debut 24 to 14 win against Serbia.
 
2005 saw the Netherlands build on the previous season with the national team playing four internationals. The Netherlands were defeated by Georgia 34 – 14 in April. They then went on to win their other three internationals against Serbia, Scotland and Germany

Serbia made the task of getting past the first round of European qualifiers all the more harder. The Netherlands suffered heavy defeats to Russia 40 – 14 and Georgia 57 – 16. As a consolation the Netherlands managed to defeat the other European newcomers Serbia 38 – 26. Netherlands finished 3rd in the Pool and failed to qualify for the 2008 Rugby League World Cup. The Netherlands capped off 2006 with a win against the Czech Republic 34 – 28.
 
Rotterdam hosted the Nederlandse International Rugby League Nines Festival for visiting European teams between 2004 and 2007.
 
At present the NRLB are a nonprofit sports association for rugby league with their main goal to get the game exposure and attract more people to the sport. The NRLB have a short summer season (4 rounds + Finals) with the Netherlands 3V Sports Grand Prix 9's competition for clubs Capelle Spartans, Delft Rugby League, Nootdorp Musketiers and Te Werve Bustards, while they host teams for 13-aside matches including the annual clash with Oxford University Old Boys (in the Kermis Challenge) and varying teams from the UK. Netherlands as national and developmental squads have participated in away tours in tournaments such as the Heidelberg 9's in Germany and UK based events.
 
In recent seasons the Dutch have also participated in a Cross Border Challenge with select German clubs, National Selection matches (Select GPN vs Residents) and promotional games (combined squad vs Capelle Spartans). At youth level this year, the Dutch staged a BARLA U17 tour against a Netherlands Tasman U17 select in July at Nootdorp and Delft.
 
Like most developing rugby league nations there are restrictions that the Dutch board face within early stages of development like funding, sponsorship, support and promotion.
 
The Dutch ten-year plan is to have a fully self-supportive domestic competition running for at least 6 months of the year and to have multiple self-standing Rugby League clubs all over the country. The national squad back on the international stage competing with the best. The Nederlandse Rugby League Bond gained Observer membership status from the Rugby League European Federation in February 2012.

In May 2013, Netherlands made 28th on the RLIF World Rankings after their match against Germany in a losing effort.

Matches

The Netherlands have played their first match in 2003 against Scotland A, losing 22 to 18. They then competed in the 2004 Rotterdam Cup, losing both their matches.

The Netherlands failed to progress past the preliminary stages of qualifying for the 2008 Rugby League World Cup, after being defeated by Georgia and Russia in 2006. They did however manage a victory against Serbia.

Following these matches, the national team went on hiatus following a dispute between the Netherlands Federation and the RLEF. In 2009, a new board " Nederlandse Rugby League Bond (NRLB) " was appointed to run the Dutch game and re-establish relations with the RLEF. The Netherlands were re-admitted to the RLEF in 2010, and resumed international competition in 2013 with a friendly match against Germany.

Jerseys
Primary

Alternative

Coaching Roster

Current Staff

Former Staff

Current squad

Squad selected for the friendly against  Spain on 17 September 2022.

Results

Record
Below is a table of the representative rugby league matches played by the Netherlands national rugby league team at test level up until 08 October 2022.

European Championship

See also

 Netherlands Rugby League Bond
 Rugby league in the Netherlands
 Dutch Rugby League Competition

References

External links
Nederlandse Rugby League Bond (NRLB)
Rugby League European Federation (RLEF)
Holland footy-Year in review
Nederland vs Czech

National rugby league teams
Rugby league in the Netherlands
R